Mohammad Roknipour (Persian: محمد رکنی‌پور, born October 13, 1992) is an Iranian footballer who plays as a midfielder for Golden State Misioneros in the Premier Development League.

Career
Roknipour signed his first professional contract with Los Angeles Blues at the tail end of their final season in the USL Pro in 2013. He later continued with the club with their move to Orange County and their re-branding to Orange County Blues in 2014.

Prior to that, Roknipour played in the USL Premier Development League for OC Blues Strikers.

External links 

 Official website
 Mohammad Roknipour on Instagram

References

1992 births
Living people
Iranian footballers
Iranian expatriate footballers
OC Pateadores Blues players
Orange County SC players
LA Laguna FC players
Association football midfielders
Expatriate soccer players in the United States
USL League Two players
USL Championship players